The Tate Twins are a professional wrestling tag team made up of brothers Brandon and Brent Tate. They are currently signed with Ring of Honor, where they teamed with Dalton Castle as The Boys and are two-time former ROH World Six-Man Tag Team Champions.

History

Ohio Valley Wrestling (2012)
On March 24, 2012, The Baronis Brothers made their Ohio Valley Wrestling debut in a dark match losing to the team of Raphael Constantine and Sean Casey. They continued to work various dark matches and televised matches until their final match with the promotion on June 7, 2012, in a dark match loss to the team of Jayce King and LMC.

Ring of Honor (2014–2019)
On July 19, 2014, edition of Ring of Honor Wrestling The Tate Twins made their ROH debut taking on War Machine in a losing effort.

In 2015, The Tate Twins began going by the name The Boys joining Dalton Castle as a stable. On September 18, 2015, at All Star Extravaganza VII with the stipulations that if Castle lost, Silas Young would get services of The Boys, while if Young lost, he would become one of Castle's Boys. Castle subsequently lost the match, with Silas Young getting The Boys. Castle faced Young in another losing effort at Final Battle, but despite The Boys seemingly siding with Young in the weeks prior to the event, they rejoined Castle following the match.

On March 10, 2017, at ROH 15th Anniversary Show, The Boys and Castle unsuccessfully challenged The Kingdom for the ROH World Six-Man Tag Team Championships.

On June 23, 2017, The Boys and Dalton Castle defeated Bully Ray and The Briscoes (Jay Briscoe and Mark Briscoe) to become the ROH World Six-Man Tag Team Champions at Best in the World. On August 20, 2017, at War of the Worlds UK, The Boys and Castle lost the titles to Bullet Club's Adam Page and The Young Bucks (Matt Jackson and Nick Jackson) in Edinburgh, Scotland.

In April 2019, The Boys ended their relationship with Castle thus leaving Ring of Honor.

Global Force Wrestling (2015)
On June 12, 2015, during the GFW Grand Slam Tour in Jackson, Tennessee, The Tate Twins made their Global Force Wrestling (GFW) debut defeating Best Friends (Chuck Taylor and Trent). The following night They picked up another victory over the Best Friends in Knoxville, Tennessee.

Return to Ohio Valley Wrestling (2020–2021)
On February 4, 2020, The Tate Twins made their return to OVW defeating the team of AJZ and Tony Bizo.

On November 7, 2020, The Tate Twins entered the 2020 Nightmare Cup Tag Team Tournament defeating three teams to win the tournament and moving onto the finals defeating The Legacy of Brutality (Ca$h Flo and Josh Ashcraft) to win the OVW Tag Team Championships.

On April 6, 2021, The Tate Twins unsuccessfully defended the OVW Tag Team Championships against the team of Jessie Godderz and Tony Gunn. They would go on to defeat Godderz and Gunn in a rematch at OVW Defiance on May 22 to regain the OVW Tag Team Championships.

On August 28, 2021, The Tate Twins lost the OVW Tag Team Championships in a six team ladder match to Darkkloudz (Deget Bundlez and Eric Darkstorm) at OVW Reckoning.

All Elite Wrestling (2021)
On the May 31, 2021 episode of AEW Dark: Elevation, Brandon and Brent Tate made their AEW debuts in a losing effort against The Acclaimed (Anthony Bowens and Max Caster).

Brandon and Brent Tate returned to AEW on the December 6, 2021 episode of AEW Dark: Elevation losing to the Jurassic Express (Luchasaurus and Jungle Boy).

Return to Ring of Honor (2022–present) 
On July 23, 2022 at Death Before Dishonor of 2022 The Boys and Dalton Castle reunited and once again reclaimed the ROH World Six-Man Tag Team Championships by defeating The Righteous (Vincent, Bateman, and Dutch) in a six man tag team match making the Tate Twins and Dalton Castle two-time ROH World Six-Man Tag Team Champions. They lost the titles at Final Battle to The Embassy, ending their reign at 140 days.

Championships and accomplishments
 Next Generation Wrestling
 NGW Tag Team Championship (1 time)
New South Wrestling
New South Tag Team Championship (1 time)
Ohio Valley Wrestling
OVW Tag Team Championship (2 times)
Nightmare Cup Tag Team Tournament (2020)
 Ring of Honor
 ROH World Six-Man Tag Team Championship (2 times) – with Dalton Castle

References

External links
The Tate Twins - Facebook
The Boys – ROH Profile
 – Brandon
 – Brent

All Elite Wrestling teams and stables
Global Force Wrestling teams and stables
National Wrestling Alliance teams and stables
Ring of Honor teams and stables
Independent promotions teams and stables
ROH World Six-Man Tag Team Champions